Patrick McDouall-Crichton, 6th Earl of Dumfries (15 October 1726 – 7 April 1803) was a Scottish peer.

In 1768 he inherited the Earldom of Dumfries from his maternal uncle William Dalrymple-Crichton, and on his death was succeeded by his grandson, John, Lord Mount Stuart, grandson of the 1st Marquess of Bute and later 2nd Marquess of Bute.

The Earl lived in London as well as his estate, Dumfries House in Ayrshire which lay directly adjacent to the lands of Auchinleck House the Boswell home. The Earl is mentioned a few more times in James Boswell's journals, and they appear to have been quite civil to each other, Boswell even visiting the Earl a few times in London in 1787 and 1788.

Family
He married Margaret ("Peggy") Crauford, daughter of Ronald Crauford of Restalrig on 12 September 1771 and there was much rejoicing in Restalrig village.

They had one child:
 Lady Elizabeth Penelope McDouall-Crichton, later Elizabeth, Lady Mount Stuart (25 November 1772 – 25 July 1797)

References

1726 births
1803 deaths
Earls of Dumfries
Scots Guards officers